This is a list of the Chancellors of Syracuse University, a private research university located in Syracuse, New York, United States.

List

Notes

References

Lists of university and college leaders
Syracuse
 
Chancellors